Amine Khazen (also Amine el-Khazen; born 6 December 1941, in Ajaltoun, Lebanon) is a Lebanese diplomat and a member of the noble Khazen family.

Education

Amine primarily studied at Saint Joseph University, in Beirut. He is fluent in Arabic, French, English, and Spanish.

Work

He was the Lebanese ambassador to the United Nations from 1990 to 1999. He also served as an ambassador in Mexico and Central America. His diplomatic work has put him in contact with high-profile figures from around the world, including Pope John Paul II and Fidel Castro.

References

External links
 el-Khazen website
 Ambassador Sheikh Amine El Khazen (Circle of Ambassadors)
 Dinner of Cheikh Amine el Khazen at Liza restaurant January 21st, 2014 (Mondanite)

Amine
Lebanese diplomats
Permanent Representatives of Lebanon to the United Nations
Living people
Saint Joseph University alumni
1941 births
People from Keserwan District